James Francis Turner (1829 – 27 April 1893) was the second Bishop of Grafton and Armidale in the 19th century.

Turner was born in Yarmouth, Norfolk in 1829.  He was educated at Durham University, where he graduated BA in 1851 and MA in 1853. He was ordained deacon in 1852, and priest in 1853. He was Chaplain of Bishop Cosin's Hall, Durham, and then held incumbencies at Canons Ashby and North Tidworth before his appointment to become Bishop of Grafton and Armidale. On 24 February 1869, Turner was ordained and consecrated a bishop, in Westminster Abbey, by Archibald Campbell Tait, Archbishop of Canterbury; George Selwyn, Bishop of New Zealand; and six other prelates.

Notes

1829 births
Alumni of University College, Durham
Anglican bishops of Grafton and Armidale
19th-century Anglican bishops in Australia
1893 deaths
People from Great Yarmouth